The Starwind 19, Starwind 190 and Spindrift 19 are a family of American trailerable sailboats that were designed by Jim Taylor Yacht Designs as cruiser-racers and first built in 1982.

The designer claims that the boat was the inspiration for the C. Raymond Hunt Associates' O'Day 192.

Production
The design was built by Starwind, the sailboat division of Wellcraft in the United States, starting in 1982. Some were built by Chrysler Marine and later by Spindrift One Designs, a division of Rebel Industries. The design is now out of production.

Design
The Starwind 19 is a recreational keelboat, built predominantly of fiberglass, with wood trim. It has a fractional sloop rig, a raked stem, a reverse transom, a transom-hung rudder controlled by a tiller and a fixed fin keel.

The boat is normally fitted with a small  outboard motor for docking and maneuvering.

The design has sleeping accommodation for four people, with a double "V"-berth in the bow cabin and two straight settee berths in the main cabin. The galley is located on the port side of the companionway ladder and is equipped with a sink. The head is located in the bow cabin under the "V"-berth.

Variants
Starwind 19
Starwind 190
Later version of the Starwind 19.
Spindrift 19

Operational history
In a 2010 review Steve Henkel wrote, "Over 600 of these nice-looking boats were built ... Best features: The Starwind is a nicely conceived and well-made boat for her size and era. A good-sized opening hatch forward, rare in a boat this size, is good for ventilation and escape in an emergency An on-deck anchor locker is also a plus. The Starwind, with a PHRF of 288, may have a small advantage on the race course; even the smaller Precision 18, more than a foot shorter on deck, but with a waterline length only four inches less, and with eight square feet less sail area, has a handicap of only 282. Worst features: We could find none significant enough to mention."

See also
List of sailing boat types

References

Keelboats
1980s sailboat type designs
Sailing yachts 
Trailer sailers
Sailboat type designs by Jim Taylor Yacht Designs
Sailboat types built by Starwind
Sailboat types built by Chrysler Marine
Sailboat types built by Spindrift One Designs